Enrico Crivellaro (born in Padua, Italy) is an Italian blues musician.

Awards
 "Best Swing Guitarist – International" (2002), Swing Awards (USA) 
 "Best Italian Blues Guitarist" (2003), Blues and Blues awards (Italy) 
 "Best Contemporary Blues Guitarist – International" (2004), Thropees France Blues (France)

Discography

References

External links
 Official website

Italian blues guitarists
Italian male guitarists
Living people
Year of birth missing (living people)
Musicians from Padua
Guitarists from Los Angeles
American male guitarists
Italian blues musicians